The Lake Louise is a lake in Estrie located in the municipality of Weedon, in the Les Appalaches Regional County Municipality (MRC), in the administrative region of Chaudière-Appalaches, in Quebec, in Canada.

Geography 
Lake Louise is located in the Saint-François River valley just upstream of the confluence with the rivière au Saumon. The Saint-François River is its main tributary and outlet; the lake is a widening of the river. The rivière aux Canards also flows into it.

See also 
 Saint-Gérard, a municipality
 Weedon, a municipality
 Rivière au Saumon (Le Haut-Saint-François), a watercourse
 Saint-François River, a watercourse
 Rivière au Rat (Weedon), a watercourse
 Les Appalaches Regional County Municipality (MRC)

References 

Lakes of Estrie
Le Haut-Saint-François Regional County Municipality